The Energy and Climate Intelligence Unit (ECIU) is an independent advisory organisation in the United Kingdom. The organisation was incorporated in 2014. According to their own about page, they are a "a non-profit organisation that supports informed debate on energy and climate change issues in the UK", supporting journalists, parliamentarians and other communicators with accurate briefings on key issues, and work with individuals and organisations that have interesting stories to tell, helping them connect to the national conversation.

The ECIU is widely referenced by British and global press when looking for data about Climate change.

The current director is former BBC environment correspondent Richard Black. Its Advisory Board includes climate scientists, energy policy experts, economists, MPs and peers.

The Unit is solely funded by philanthropic foundations; they acknowledge support from the European Climate Foundation, the Grantham Foundation for the Protection of the Environment, the Oak Foundation, and the Climate Change Collaboration. The Unit received funding of £346,000 in 2018.

Notable research 
ECIU created a series of studies to estimate how much of the global economy committed to net zero. The research reported 16% of the global economy was committed to such a commitment in June 2019. In February 2020 the organization estimated that 49% of the global GDP was committed to a net zero target. In May 2020, ECIU estimated that 53% of global DFP is committed to a net zero target for 2050.

References

Environmental organisations based in the United Kingdom